Solana is a Spanish surname. Notable people with the surname include:

 Javier Solana (born 1942), Spanish physicist, politician and diplomat
 Steven Solana (born 1988), Spanish-American entrepreneur and philanthropist
 Fernando Solana (born 1931), Mexican diplomat and politician
 Jesús Ángel Solana (born 1964), Spanish football player and coach
 Moisés Solana (1935–1969), Mexican racing driver
 Carlos Solana, Mexican musician known as "Matricula 2", record label Sony Music
 Gabriel Solana, Mexican Makeup Illusionist working in Hollywood, LA

Spanish-language surnames